The qualification for the 2020 men's Olympic water polo tournament allocated twelve teams quota spots: the hosts, the top team in the World League, the top two teams in the World Championships, five continental Olympic qualification tournament champions, and the three top teams at an Olympic qualifying tournament.

Qualification summary

2019 FINA World League

The best team in the 2019 World League qualified for the Olympics.

2019 World Championships

The top two teams in the 2019 World Championships qualified for the Olympics.

Continental tournaments
One team from each continental qualifying event qualifies for the Olympics.

Asia

Nur-Sultan, Kazakhstan, was supposed to host the Asian continental tournament from 12 to 16 February. In late January the event was cancelled as the Kazakh Government suspended all flights and visas from China due to concerns about the coronavirus pandemic in the Eastern part of the country. In mid-February AASF decided to use the final ranking of 2018 Asian Games to allocate its continental quotas to the winners and the slots in WQT to the following teams in said ranking; the decision must yet be made official by FINA and IOC before the World Qualification Tournament, scheduled from 22 to 29 March.

Europe

Americas

World Qualification Tournament

The tournament was scheduled to be contested in Rotterdam, Netherlands, from 31 May to 7 June but was postponed to 14 to 21 February 2021 due to the COVID-19 pandemic. The draw of pools was held at FINA headquarters in Lausanne, Switzerland, on 11 February 2020. The top three teams qualified for the Olympics. It than took place from 21 to 28 February 2021.

Participating teams

Final ranking

See also
Water polo at the 2020 Summer Olympics – Women's qualification

References

External links
FINA official website
IOC official website

Qualification for the 2020 Summer Olympics
M
Impact of the COVID-19 pandemic on the 2020 Summer Olympics